Born on the Fourth of July, published in 1976, is the best-selling autobiography by Ron Kovic, a paralyzed Vietnam War veteran who became an anti-war activist. Kovic was born on July 4, 1946, and his book's ironic title echoed a famous line from George M. Cohan's patriotic 1904 song, "The Yankee Doodle Boy" (also known as "Yankee Doodle Dandy"). The book was adapted into a 1989 Academy Award-winning film of the same name co-written by Oliver Stone and Ron Kovic, starring Tom Cruise as Kovic.

Origin
Born on the Fourth of July was written in Santa Monica, California, during the fall of 1974 in exactly one month, three weeks and two days. It tells the story of Kovic's life growing up in Massapequa, New York, joining the United States Marine Corps right out of high school, going to Vietnam for two tours of duty, getting shot, finding himself paralyzed and in need of a wheelchair, and eventually starting a new life as a peace activist.

Differences from the film adaptation

 Ron Kovic is shown to have confessed his supposed role in the Marine Corporal's accidental death to the deceased man's sympathetic parents and widow, who admits that she cannot find it in her heart to forgive him, but God might do so. In reality, this meeting never happened, but director Stone admits this was done to add to the inner conflict Kovic was going through and to give him some closure.
 Kyra Sedgwick's character of Donna, Ron's on-screen high school sweetheart, never existed and did not inspire him to become an anti-war activist. The film portrays Kovic watching her protest after the Kent State Shootings and get beaten up by police. Although Kovic did not witness the protest in person, he nevertheless did watch the event on television, and the memoir states that he was outraged by the treatment of the protesters, much like his feelings towards the treatment of his fellow veterans.

Cultural references
Bruce Springsteen dedicated his 1978 performance of "Darkness on the Edge of Town" live at Winterland to Kovic, saying that he read Born on the Fourth of July, and "loved the book a whole lot".  He frequently mentions the book, and his chance meeting with Kovic, before playing his song "Shut Out the Light". However Springsteen in his autobiography and Broadway show says he first read the book in 1980.
Folk musician Tom Paxton adapted the book into a song of the same title on his 1977 album New Songs from the Briarpatch, and met Kovic backstage at the Bottom Line Club in New York City the same year.
American punk rock band Green Day references the title of the film in their 2009 song "21st Century Breakdown".
 American punk rock band The Gaslight Anthem references the title of the film in their 2014 song "Rollin' and Tumblin'" on the album Get Hurt.
 British singer Ed Sheeran references the title of the film in his rap verse in Taylor Swift's 2017 song "End Game".

See also
Births on July 4th

References

1976 non-fiction books
American autobiographies
Autobiographies adapted into films
McGraw-Hill books
Vietnam War memoirs